"No More One More Time" is a song written by Troy Seals and Dave Kirby, and recorded by the American country music artist Jo-El Sonnier. It was released in February 1988 as the second single from the album Come On Joe.  The song reached number 7 on the Billboard Hot Country Singles & Tracks chart.

Charts

Weekly charts

Year-end charts

References

1988 singles
Jo-El Sonnier songs
Songs written by Troy Seals
RCA Records Nashville singles
1988 songs